The Articles of Capitulation of Quebec were agreed upon between Jean-Baptiste Nicolas Roch de Ramezay, King's Lieutenant, Admiral Sir Charles Saunders, and General George Townshend on behalf of the French and British crowns during the Seven Years' War. They were signed on 18 September 1759, shortly after British victory in the Battle of the Plains of Abraham.

All 11 demands of De Ramsay were granted by the British Army: the honors of war, the protection of the civilians and their properties, the free exercise of the Roman Catholic religion, etc. Several months later, on 28 April 1760, the French Royal Army attempted to retake Quebec City, at the Battle of Sainte-Foy. Although victorious in battle, the French were unable to retake the city due to a lack of naval support. General Chevalier de Lévis  lifted the siege after the French Navy was defeated at the Battle of Neuville.

Nearly a year after the Articles of Capitulation for Quebec was signed, the government of New France capitulated in Montreal on 8 September 1760 after a two-month British campaign.

Text

References

See also
 Articles of Capitulation of Montreal
 History of Quebec City

New France
Battles of the French and Indian War
1759 in Canada
1759 in the French colonial empire
1750s in New France
History of Quebec
Pre-Confederation Quebec
1759 in North America
18th century in Quebec
18th-century documents
Surrenders